The Gando Special Force (1 December 1938 - 1945) ( Japanese Hepburn romanization: Kantō Tokusetsutai ) was an independent battalion within the Manchukuo Imperial Army composed primarily of ethnic Koreans, and some experienced foreign mercenaries from Asia tasked with suppressing anti-Japanese, and pro-communist militant groups in the border areas between northern Japanese occupied Korea and Manchukuo.

Ex-GSF soldiers/officers are regarded as Chinilpa in modern Korea for their role in suppressing groups advocating Korean independence.

History
The Jiandao region of Kirin province in Manchuria, known in Korean as “Gando”, was an area that had been inhabited largely by ethnic Koreans. Before  the Japanese occupation of Korea in 1905, many Koreans opposed to the annexation relocated from Korea to Gando and established Korean independence movements. Many of these movements later came under the control of the Chinese Communist Party via the Northeast Anti-Japanese United Army.

From 1907, the Japanese government claimed jurisdiction over all ethnic Koreans regardless of physical location, and friction increased with the government of Qing dynasty China over control of the Gando area, cumulating in the Gando Convention of 1909. After the Manchurian Incident, and the establishment of Japanese control over all of Manchuria in 1931, another wave of Korean immigration occurred, this time with Japanese encouragement, to help cement Japanese claims on the territory.

With the establishment of Manchukuo in 1932, the situation in Gando was very unstable, with the local population rent into pro-Japanese and anti-Japanese/anti-Manchukuo factions, many of which resorted to guerrilla warfare. In an effort to subjugate the region, the Japanese recruited pro-Japanese Korean volunteers into a special warfare force and had trained by the Manchukuo Imperial Army primarily in counterinsurgency tactics.

A number of ethnic Koreans saw better opportunities for advancement via the Manchukuo military academies than would have been impossible in the Imperial Japanese Army, and joined the new force. These included future Republic of Korea general Paik Sun-yup.  Historian Philip Jowett noted that during the Japanese occupation of Manchuria, the Gando Special Force "earned a reputation for brutality and was reported to have laid waste to large areas which came under its rule."

After the surrender of Japan, many members of the Gando Special Force were incorporated into the new Republic of Korea Army by the United States Army, for their training, and intimate knowledge of the terrain of the northern part of the Korean peninsula, and the tactics of the Korean People's Army. Some later rose to high positions within the government of the Republic of Korea.

References 

Armies of Manchukuo
Korean collaborators with Imperial Japan
Anti-communism
Military units and formations established in 1938
Military units and formations disestablished in 1945